The San Lorenzo-Puerto General San Martín Port Complex is a series of port facilities on the western shore of the lower course of the Paraná River in Argentina, which are shared by the cities of San Lorenzo and Puerto General San Martín, province of Santa Fe.

This complex receives traffic coming from the Atlantic Ocean through the Río de la Plata. The depth of the river is kept at 34 feet by dredging.

San Lorenzo-Puerto General San Martín form a major commercial terminal for agricultural exports. Traffic at the complex accounts for 50% of the Argentine exports of soybean products. In 2004, the complex managed 7.4 million tonnes of cereals (36% of the country's total exports of corn, wheat and sorghum).

Reportedly, the port is also used by Colombian drug-trafficking organizations, to ship drugs to places in Europe and other places abroad.

See also
 List of ports in Argentina
 Foreign trade of Argentina

References 

 Complejo Portuario San Lorenzo-Puerto San Martín at Nuestro Mar.
 Café de las Ciudades, 16 July 2005.  Puerto San Martín, al ritmo de la soja.
 Government of the Province of Santa Fe. Cereals exported through ports in Santa Fe.

Ports and harbours of Argentina
Paraná River